José Gomes may refer to:

Artist and entertainers
 José Gomes Ferreira (1900–1985), Portuguese poet and fiction writer
 José Pedro Gomes (born 1951), Portuguese actor, author and theatre director

Sportspeople

Association football
 José Gomes (judoka) (born 1954), Portuguese Olympic judoka
 José Gomes (football manager) (born 1970), Portuguese football manager for Marítimo
 José Gomes (footballer, born 1976), Portuguese football manager and former right-back
 José Gomes (footballer, born 1996), Portuguese football left-back for Nacional
 José Gomes (footballer, born 1999), Portuguese football striker for Cluj

Other sports
 Joe Gomes (Joseph Oliver Gomes, born Jose Gomes, 1908–1986), American baseball player
 José Gomes (volleyball)  (born 1994), Portuguese volleyball player on 2014 FIVB Volleyball World League squad

See also
 José Gómez (disambiguation)